John Brendan O'Sullivan (born 1933) is a former Australian racing cyclist. He won the Australian national road race title in 1962. He also competed at the 1956 Summer Olympics.

References

External links
 

1933 births
Living people
Australian male cyclists
Place of birth missing (living people)
Olympic cyclists of Australia
Cyclists at the 1956 Summer Olympics